Darreh Mal (also Romanized as Darreh Māl; also known as Darreh Māl-e Abraj, Darreh Mālī, Darreh Mālī, and Darreh Mān) is a village in Abarj Rural District, Dorudzan District, Marvdasht County, Fars Province, Iran. At the 2006 census, its population was 70, in 10 families.

References 

Populated places in Marvdasht County